Christian Democracy Sicily (DCS), also known as New Christian Democracy (Nuova Democrazia Cristiana), is a Christian-democratic political party based in Sicily, Italy. Its leader is Salvatore Cuffaro, a former President of Sicily.

History 
In October 2020 Cuffaro launched the DCS, in connection with the Christian Democracy led by Renato Grassi and Renzo Gubert. The party ran for the first time with its own list in the municipal elections of 2021 in Sicily, obtaining good results and several seats (11.5% and three seats in Favara, 6.4% and one seat in Giarre, 6.7% and one seat in Caltagirone and 4.4% in San Cataldo).

In March 2021 the party reached an agreement with Us of the Centre of Clemente Mastella looking forward the following elections. However, in the municipal elections of June, the party ran in a joint list with Us with Italy in Messina (1.6%) and in Niscemi (10.1% and two seats), while ran with an autonomous list in Palermo, in support of Roberto Lagalla (5.5% and three seats) and in Aci Catena (7.5% and one seat).

In August 2022, in the run-up of the 2022 Sicilian regional election, Cuffaro announced his party's support for Renato Schifani. In the election, the DCS obtained 6.5% of the vote within the centre-right coalition, electing 5 deputies to the Sicilian Regional Assembly.

In January 2023, MEP Francesca Donato, a former member of the League, joined the DCS.

Electoral results

Regional Councils

References

External links
Official website

2020 establishments in Italy
Christian democratic parties in Italy
Catholic political parties
Political parties established in 2020
Political parties in Sicily